HMS Stork was a 16-gun ship sloop of the Cormorant class in the Royal Navy, ordered in November 1794 to a joint design by Sir John Henslow and William Rule, launched in 1796 at Deptford Dockyard.

Career

She was commissioned in December 1796 under Commander Richard Pearson. Under various commanding officers, she served during the rest of the French Revolutionary War and subsequently throughout the Napoleonic War, being paid off at Sheerness from service in September 1815 and sold for breaking up eight months later.

References
 Winfield, Rif, British Warships in the Age of Sail: 1793-1817 (Seaforth Publishing, 2007) .

 

Cormorant-class ship-sloops
1796 ships